Daphne altaica is a shrub, of the family Thymelaeaceae.  It is deciduous, and is found across Asia, including in parts of Russia, Mongolia, and China. It is found at elevations of about 1000 m.

Description
The shrub grows with an erect habit, to a height of 0.4 m to 0.8 m.  It flowers from May to June, and bears fruit from July to September.

References

altaica